Volleyball has featured as a sport at the European Youth Summer Olympic Festival since its First edition in 1991 For women and then in 2003 for men, It has appeared on the programme at every subsequent edition of the biennial multi-sport event.

Men's tournaments

Medal table

Women's tournaments

Medal table

Overall medal table

See also 
Athletics at the European Youth Olympic Festival

References

External links
 Eurolympic Results

 
European Youth Olympic Festival
Volleyball competitions in Europe
Sports at the European Youth Summer Olympic Festival
Youth volleyball